Court of Opinions is one of the first Canadian panel discussion television series, airing on CBC Television in 1952.

Premise
Neil Leroy moderated the panel which consisted of Lister Sinclair, Kate Aitken and two guests. Court of Opinions was adapted from a CBC Radio series.

Scheduling
This half-hour series was broadcast on most Wednesday nights from 10 September to 26 November 1952, normally at 9:30 p.m. (Eastern).

References

External links
 

CBC Television original programming
1952 Canadian television series debuts
1952 Canadian television series endings
Black-and-white Canadian television shows